Jason Hoyte is a New Zealand screen and voice actor and radio DJ. He has at least 25 television shows to his credit and is best known for his roles as Steve Mudgeway in Seven Periods with Mr Gormsby and Malcolm "Smudge" in Nothing Trivial. He is also known for starring in the film The Insatiable Moon, and starred as Franklin Corke in the New Zealand Comedy/Drama Outrageous Fortune.

Hoyte is currently one of the Co-Hosts on the Radio Hauraki Big Show, from 4 till 7pm weekdays, alongside fellow New Zealand actor and radio DJ, Mike Minogue.

Career
Hoyte was born in Rotorua, New Zealand, and attended Auckland boarding school, Dilworth. He lives with his wife in Glen Eden, Auckland, New Zealand. 

Hoyte began his career in stand-up comedy and won a Billy T. comedy award and a Chapman Tripp Theatre Awards as part of 90s comedy duo Sugar & Spice (alongside Jonathan Brugh). After roles in Xena: Warrior Princess and  Hercules: The Legendary Journeys he won acclaim for his portrayal of an untrustworthy, but politically correct guidance counsellor, Steve Mudgeway in the comedy Seven Periods with Mr Gormsby. He was nominated at the 2003 New Zealand Film Awards for his acting in short film Beautiful. In 2015 he starred in parody talk show Late Night Big Breakfast alongside Leigh Hart. In 2017 he and Hart produced parody fishing show Screaming Reels. The show was mistaken for an actual documentary in Australia. He has also narrated for New Zealand reality shows City Beat, Coastwatch, Dog Squad and Animal House.

Hoyte was a radio host for the Alternative Commentary Collective and on Radio Hauraki's weekdays drive-time show 'Daily Bhuja'. but finished 5 April 2019. He resumed this drive-time role in 2021 with new co-host Mike Minogue. In 2021 he starred in Talkback, a mocumentary web-series about a talkback radio host.

Hoyte is also infamous for his "Cook the man some f**king eggs" scene from 'The Late Night Big Breakfast' show in 2014.

Filmography

Television

Film

References

External links

Living people
New Zealand male television actors
New Zealand male voice actors
New Zealand male soap opera actors
New Zealand radio presenters
Radio Hauraki
People educated at Dilworth School
20th-century New Zealand male actors
21st-century New Zealand male actors
1981 births
New Zealand male comedians